Kustom can refer to:

Kustom (cars), a particular style of custom car, popularised in the 1950s
Kustom Amplification, a manufacturer of guitar equipment
Kustom (footwear), a brand of Billabong
Kustom Kulture